Trinity School (formerly Peniel Academy) was an independent school in Essex, England. The school was located in Brentwood and was closely linked to Trinity Church. The school closed in 2018.

References 

Defunct schools in Essex
2018 disestablishments in England
Educational institutions disestablished in 2018